Artis Ābols (born January 3, 1973) is a Latvian former professional ice hockey forward and coach. He is the current head coach of HK Zemgale/LLU of the Latvian Hockey Higher League, as well as an assistant coach of the Latvia men's national ice hockey team. His son, Rodrigo Ābols, is also an ice hockey player and was selected by the Vancouver Canucks in the 2016 NHL Entry Draft.

Career statistics

Regular season and playoffs

International

References

External links

1973 births
Living people
Kokkolan Hermes players
Jokipojat players
Latvian ice hockey coaches
Latvian ice hockey forwards
Expatriate ice hockey players in Finland
Expatriate ice hockey players in Denmark
HK Liepājas Metalurgs players
Nyköpings Hockey players
Odense Bulldogs players
Dinamo Riga coaches
HK Riga 2000 players
Ice hockey people from Riga
Vojens IK players
Expatriate ice hockey players in Sweden
Latvian expatriate ice hockey people
Latvian expatriate sportspeople in Denmark
Latvian expatriate sportspeople in Sweden
Latvian expatriate sportspeople in Finland